The Issa Valley is a 1982 film adaptation of 1955 novel by Czesław Miłosz, directed by Tadeusz Konwicki.

See also
 Cinema of Poland
 List of Polish language films

External links
 

1982 films
1980s Polish-language films